The British Museum Department of Coins and Medals is a department of the British Museum involving the collection, research and exhibition of numismatics, and comprising the largest library of numismatic artefacts in the United Kingdom, including almost one million coins, medals, tokens and other related objects. The collection spans the history of coinage from its origins in the 7th century BC to the present day, and is representative of both Eastern and Western numismatic traditions.

History

Numismatics constituted an important part of the 1753 bequest of Sir Hans Sloane which formed the British Museum's original collection, comprising some 20,000 objects. The collection was incorporated into the Department of Antiquities in 1807, before the establishment of a separate Coins and Medals department in 1860–1.

As in other parts of the museum, the department has been able to expand its collection by purchase, donation and bequest. The department has benefited from the munificence of collectors such as Clayton Mordaunt Cracherode, Sarah Banks, Edward Hawkins, Sir Alexander Cunningham and George Bleazby. A significant strength of the collection are British coins from all ages, which have benefited from the ancient law of Treasure Trove.  This has enabled the museum to purchase important hoards of gold and silver coins, many of which were buried during periods of crisis or upheaval. There are approximately 9,000 coins, medals and banknotes on display around the British Museum. More than half of these can be found in the Citi Money Gallery (Gallery 68), while the remainder form part of the permanent displays throughout the museum. Items from the full collection can be seen by the general public in the Study Room by appointment.

The department celebrated its 150th anniversary in 2011.

Research, publications and exhibitions
The Department has a strong research history, which underpins publications (see, for example, the British Museum Catalogues of Coins), exhibitions and other activities.

Publications associated with exhibitions 
 1881	A Guide to the English Medals Exhibited in the King’s Library, by Herbert A. Grueber
 1881	A Guide to the Italian Medals Exhibited in the King’s Library, by C. E. Keary
 1883	The British Museum [Martin] Luther Exhibition, 1883, in the Grenville Library, by George Bullen 
 1924	Guide to the exhibition of historical medals in the British Museum
 1924	A guide to the exhibition of medals of the Renaissance in the British Museum, by G. F. Hill
 1975	2000 years of coins and medals, by J. P. C. Kent
 1979	Art of the Medal, by Mark Jones
 1986	Money: from Cowrie shells to credit cards, by Joe Cribb
 1987	Contemporary British Medals, by Mark Jones
 1987	As good as gold: 300 years of British banknote design, by Virginia Hewitt and John Keyworth
 1990	Fake? The art of deception, by Mark Jones 
 1992	FIDEM XXIII: In the Round: Contemporary Art Medals of the World, ed. Philip Attwood
 1993	Silk Road coins: the Hirayama Collection. A loan exhibition at the British Museum, by Katsumi Tanabe 
 1993	The Hoxne Treasure: an illustrated handbook, by Roger Bland and Catherine Johns
 1994	Beauty and the Banknote: images of women on paper money, by Virginia Hewitt
 1995	The Banker’s Art, ed. Virginia Hewitt
 1996	After Marathon: war, society and money in fifth century Greece, by Ute Wartenberg
 1998	Humphrey Cole: Mint, measurement and maps in Elizabethan England, ed. Silke Ackernann
 1998	Convict love tokens: the leaden hearts the convicts left behind, by Michele Field and Timothy Millet 
 1999	Magic coins of Java, Bali and the Malay Peninsula, thirteenth to twentieth centuries, by Joe Cribb 
 1999	Metal Mirror: Coin Photographs, by Stephen Sack
 1999	Size immaterial: handheld sculpture of the 1990s, by Luke Syson
 2000	Rebels, pretenders and imposters, by Clive Cheesman and Jonathan Williams
 2003	Italian Medals c. 1520–1600 in British public collections, by Philip Attwood
 2004	Badges, by Philip Attwood
 2008	Chairman Mao badges: symbols and slogans of the Cultural Revolution, by Helen Wang
 2009	Medals of dishonour, by Philip Attwood and Felicity Powell
 2010	Money in Africa, ed. by Catherine Eagleton, Harcourt Fuller and John Perkins
 2011	Eric Gill: Lust for Letter & Line, by Ruth Cribb and Joe Cribb 
 2013	Coins and the Bible, by Richard Abdy and Amelia Dowler
 2014	Hard at Work: The Diary of Leonard Wyon 1853–1867, by Philip Attwood
 2015	Hoards: Hidden History, by Eleanor Ghey
 2016	Defacing the Past, by Dario Calomino
 2019	Playing With Money: Currency and Games, by Robert Bracey (London: Spink)
 2020–22 Rivalling Rome. Parthian Coins and Culture, by Vesta Sarkhosh Curtis and Alexandra Magub (London: Spink, 2020, reprint, 2022)	

Other publications
 1920  Grains and grammes. A table of equivalents for the use of numismatists, by G. F. Hill

Members of the Department
In addition to being numismatists, staff of the department have also been distinguished linguists, historians, archaeologists, art historians, classicists, medievalists, orientalists, and authors:

Keepers (Head) of the Department 

William Vaux, from 1861
Reginald Stuart Poole, from 1870
Barclay Head, from 1893
Herbert A. Grueber, from 1906
George Hill, from 1912
John Allan, from 1931
Stanley Robinson, from 1949
John Walker, from 1952
G. Kenneth Jenkins, from 1965
Robert Carson, from 1977
John Kent, from 1983
Mark Jones, from 1990
Andrew Burnett, from 1992
Joe Cribb, from 2002
Philip Attwood, from 2010

Staff 

Richard Abdy
Jennifer Adam
Derek Allen
Benjamin Alsop
Marion Archibald
Edward Besley
Roger Bland
Maxim Bolt
Robert Bracey
Cecile Bresc
George C. Brooke
Dario Calomino
Ian Carradice
Taylor Combe
Barrie Cook
Vesta Sarkhosh Curtis
Michael Dolley
Amelia Dowler
Catherine Eagleton
Elizabeth Errington
Henry Flynn
Percy Gardner
Leigh Gardner
Eleanor Ghey
Andrew Gifford
Megan Gooch
Amanda Gregory
Edward Hawkins
Virginia Hewitt
Mary Hinton
Richard Hobbs
Thomas Hockenhull
Francis Keary
Richard Kelleher
Paramdip Khera
Janet Larkin
Kirstin Leighton-Boyce
Ian Leins
Keith Lowe
Nicholas Lowick
David MacDowall
Alexandra Magub
Joan Martin
Harold Mattingly
Andrew Meadows
Sam Moorhead
Elvina Noel
John Orna-Ornstein
Elizabeth Pendleton
Laura Phillips
Stuart Lane Poole
Jane Portal
Venetia Porter
Martin Price
Edward Rapson
Richard Southgate
Luke Syson
Philippa Walton
Helen Wang
Ute Wartenberg
Jonathan Williams
Gareth Williams
Warwick Wroth

See also
British Museum Catalogues of Coins
Numismatics
Silk Road numismatics
Digital Book Index

Gallery

References

Archaeological museums in London
British Museum
History of museums
Museums established in 1753
Numismatic museums in the United Kingdom